Velda is a name given to the hypothetical ancestress of the Cantabrian people and Haplogroup V (mtDNA). She was coined in the book The Seven Daughters of Eve by Bryan Sykes. Theoretically, based on DNA studies, she lived in the region of the Cantabrian mountains about 15,000 BC. Even today, Haplogroup V is found with particularly high concentrations in the people of Cantabria (15%) of northern Iberia but specially in the Sami people of northern Scandinavia: Swedish Sami (68%), Finnish Sami (37%) and Norwegian Sami (33%).

References

Sources
Bryan Sykes, The Seven Daughters of Eve -  - published in 2001.

Genetic genealogy
History of Cantabria
Sámi